This is a list of albums released under Pledis Entertainment.

2007

2008

2009

2010

2011

2012

2013

2014

2015

2016

2017

2018

2019

2020

2021

2022

2023

Notes

References 
 Pledis Entertainment Official Website
 Pledis Entertainment on YouTube

Pledis Entertainment
Pop music discographies
Discographies of South Korean record labels